The 2015 ARCA Racing Series presented by Menards was the 63rd season of the ARCA Racing Series. The season began on February 14 with the Lucas Oil 200 presented by Autozone and ended October 16 with the Full Throttle S'loonshine 98.9.

The championship was won by GMS Racing driver Grant Enfinger, who won a series-high six races during the season, including the first three of the season at Daytona, Mobile and the Nashville Fairgrounds. Enfinger finished 425 points clear of his nearest rival for the title, Mason Mitchell Motorsports' Austin Wayne Self, who passed Josh Williams (Josh Williams Motorsports) for the runner-up position at the final race. Self finished outside the top fifteen on only two occasions, and won one race during the season, at Winchester; while Williams recorded no fewer than fifteen top-ten finishes but was unable to break into victory lane.

The only other driver inside the top ten in the final championship standings to take a race victory was Kyle Weatherman, for the Cunningham Motorsports team. Weatherman was the race winner at the New Jersey Motorsports Park road course, and despite missing a quarter of the races in 2015, Weatherman was able to finish in tenth place in the final championship standings. Ten other drivers won races during the 2015 season; Mason Mitchell and Ryan Reed each won two races, while A. J. Fike, Ken Schrader, Blake Jones, Travis Braden, Cole Custer, Trevor Bayne, Ross Kenseth and Todd Gilliland all made one visit to victory lane.

Teams and drivers

Complete schedule

Limited schedule

Notes

Changes
 Thomas Praytor ran a full season for his new family team, Max Force Racing, having been a driver with Hixson Motorsports for the prior two years.
 Canadian female driver Sarah Cornett-Ching ran for rookie of the year in the No. 2, replacing Praytor. She drove for a new team, RACE 101, which was fielded in a partnership with Hixson.
 Driver Terry Jones and crew chief Mark Rette formed a new team, Rette Jones Racing, that ran on a partial basis.
 Josh Reeves was scheduled to run a full season for Carter 2 Motorsports as a development driver, but this did not occur.
 Brennan Poole was scheduled to drive a minimum of 10 races for Team BCR Racing, but those plans were called off once he was announced to run a partial Xfinity Series schedule for HScott Motorsports with Chip Ganassi. His only ARCA attempt in 2015 (and for Team BCR) was a withdrawal at Daytona.
 Frank Kimmel cut back his schedule after 18 full seasons in ARCA. Additionally, Kimmel moved from Win-Tron Racing to the Venturini Motorsports No. 25 car, sharing the ride with Brandon Jones.
 Bo LeMastus ran full-time and for rookie of the year with his own team, the No. 42 Dodge/Toyota for Crosley Sports Group.
 It was announced that Clay Campbell, Matt Tifft, and Ross Kenseth would share Ken Schrader Racing's No. 52 car for the full season, along with Schrader himself. Hunter Baize would later join those four drivers in the car as well, making two starts.
 It was announced that Will Kimmel would drive his family team's No. 69 Ford full-time again in 2015, although he did end up being replaced in two races by Matt Wallace and in one by James Swanson this season.
 After driving at Daytona in the No. 68 for Kimmel Racing, it was announced that David Levine would run for rookie of the year and drive the No. 59 for Lira Motorsports for the remainder of the season.
 Bobby Hamilton Jr. was set to run the full season for Carter 2 Motorsports in the No. 97 Dodge, but he left the team after ten races.
 Venturini Motorsports' No. 55 Toyota was shared between drivers including Cody Coughlin, Dominic Ursetta, and Todd Gilliland, who won in his series debut at Toledo just days after turning 15 and being eligible to race in ARCA.

Schedule

The 2015 schedule was fully released on November 26, 2014.

Results and standings

Races

Drivers' championship
(key) Bold – Pole position awarded by time. Italics – Pole position set by final practice results or rainout. * – Most laps led.

See also
 2015 NASCAR Sprint Cup Series
 2015 NASCAR Xfinity Series
 2015 NASCAR Camping World Truck Series
 2015 NASCAR K&N Pro Series East
 2015 NASCAR K&N Pro Series West
 2015 NASCAR Whelen Modified Tour
 2015 NASCAR Whelen Southern Modified Tour
 2015 NASCAR Canadian Tire Series
 2015 NASCAR Mexico Series
 2015 NASCAR Whelen Euro Series

References

External links

ARCA Menards Series seasons
ARCA